Earl Graves may refer to:

 Earl G. Graves Sr. (1935–2020), American entrepreneur, publisher, businessman and philanthropist
 Earl G. Graves Jr. (born 1962), American businessman and basketball player